The River Styx is a river in Charlton County, in the southeastern part of the U.S. state of Georgia.

See also
List of rivers of Georgia

References 
USGS Geographic Names Information Service
USGS Hydrologic Unit Map - State of Georgia (1974)

Rivers of Georgia (U.S. state)
Rivers of Charlton County, Georgia